The 1978–79 season was Burnley's third consecutive season in the second tier of English football. They were managed by Harry Potts.

Appearances and goals

|}

Matches

Football League Division Two
Key

In Result column, Burnley's score shown first
H = Home match
A = Away match

pen. = Penalty kick
o.g. = Own goal

Results

Final league position

FA Cup

League Cup

Anglo-Scottish Cup

References

Burnley F.C. seasons
Burnley